This is a list of the bays of Wales by principal area, taken clockwise around the Welsh coast from the English border at Chepstow to the Dee estuary. It includes coastal indentations which are known by names other than bay (e.g. haven, porth) but which nevertheless have similar characteristics. In addition to those listed, there are numerous bays which remain unnamed on Ordnance Survey (OS) maps, the principal source of names appearing in this list.

By far the largest bay in Wales is Cardigan Bay, occupying the larger part of the west coast. Other major bays are Swansea Bay, Carmarthen Bay, St Brides Bay, Caernarfon Bay and Conwy Bay. The list is divided into principal areas; 16 of the 22 in Wales have a coast though that of Powys is insignificant. Pembrokeshire has been further divided in view of the large number of bays along its intricate coastline, the greater part of which is protected as a national park. Where a bay is shared by more than one principal area, it is listed under both.

Monmouthshire and Newport
Both Monmouthshire and Newport front onto the Severn Estuary. There are no named bays along the low-lying coast of these two principal areas.

Cardiff
Cardiff Bay is not a bay but rather a body of water enclosed behind Cardiff Bay Barrage since the 1990s.

Vale of Glamorgan
Many of the mainly shallow bays along the coast of the Vale of Glamorgan are backed by cliffs of Jurassic limestone. The Vale of Glamorgan's boundary with Cardiff runs through Cardiff Bay.
Ranny Bay 
St Mary's Well Bay
Ball Bay
Swanbridge Bay
Sully Bay
Jackson's Bay
Whitmore Bay
Barry Harbour
Watch House Bay
Dams Bay
Ffontygarri Bay
Limpert Bay
Penry Bay
Summerhouse Bay
Stout Bay
Tresilian Bay
St Donat's Bay
Dunraven Bay

Bridgend
The coast of Bridgend is low lying with plentiful sand. The largest bay, east of Porthcawl is unnamed on OS maps.
Trecco Bay
Sandy Bay
Rest Bay

Neath Port Talbot
The coast of Neath Port Talbot is low-lying and relatively straight save for estuaries and a harbour complex.
Baglan Bay where the River Neath enters the larger Swansea Bay
Swansea Bay (part)

Swansea
The coast of Swansea includes half of Swansea Bay, half of the Loughor estuary and the entirety of the Gower Peninsula.
Swansea Bay (part)
Bracelet Bay
Limeslade Bay
Langland Bay
Caswell Bay
Brandy Cove
Pwlldu Bay
Bantam Bay
Three Cliffs Bay
Oxwich Bay
Port-Eynon Bay
Overton Mere
Mewslade Bay
Fall Bay
Rhossili Bay
Broughton Bay

Carmarthenshire
The Carmarthenshire coast includes a handful of large estuaries and a couple of large dune systems.
Carmarthen Bay (part)

Pembrokeshire
The scenic cliff-backed bays and headlands of Pembrokeshire are a key part of the area's designation as a national park.

South Pembrokeshire
From the Carmarthenshire border, west to the mouth of Milford Haven.
Carmarthen Bay (part)
Saundersfoot Bay
Brownslade Bay
Waterwynch Bay
Lydstep Haven
Skrinkle Haven
Manorbier Bay
Swanlake Bay
Freshwater East
Barafundle Bay
Broad Haven
Bullslaughter Bay
Flimston Bay
Pen-y-holt Bay
Hobbyhorse Bay
Wind Bay
Blucks Pool
Freshwater West
Gravel Bay
East Pickard Bay
West Pickard Bay
Parsonsquarry Bay
Whitedole Bay
Castles Bay

Caldey Island
Caldey Island is an offshore part of Pembrokeshire.
Priory Bay
Sandy Bay
Red Berry Bay
Sandtop Bay

Milford Haven section
The Milford Haven Waterway include numerous sheltered creeks and bays.
West Angle Bay
Angle Bay
Bullwell Bay
Mill Bay
Scotch Bay
Gelliswick Bay
Sandy Haven
Sleeping Bay
Butts Bay
Longoar Bay
Lindsway Bay
Watch House Bay
Monk Haven
(Dale Roads)
Castlebeach Bay
Watwick Bay

Southwest Pembrokeshire
From Milford Haven to St Brides Bay.
Mill Bay
Frenchman's Bay
Welshman's Bay
Westdale Bay
Watery Bay
Victoria Bay
Little Castle Bay
Deadman's Bay
Mouse's Haven

Skokholm
Skokholm is an offshore part of Pembrokeshire.
North Haven
East Bay
Peter's Bay
Hog Bay
Crab Bay
Mad Bay
Little Bay

Skomer
Skomer is an offshore part of Pembrokeshire.
North Haven
South Haven
Pigstone Bay

St Brides Bay
St Brides Bay is a deep indentation in Pembrokeshire's west coast which contains numerous smaller bays.
Martin's Haven
St Bride's Haven
Warey Haven
Mill Haven
Brandy Bay
Musselwick
Rook's Bay
Little Haven
The Settlands
Broad Haven
Druidston Haven
North Haven
Madoc's Haven
Nolton Haven
Davy Williams' Haven
St Brides Bay
Cwm Bach
Porthmynawyd
Numerous smaller inlets including: Aber Dwyrain, Aber-west, Porth y Bwch, Porth Gwyn, Gwadn, Loch warren, Aber Llong, Porth y Rhaw - all near Solfach.
Caer Bwdy Bay
Caerfai Bay
St Non's Bay
Numerous smaller inlets including: Porth Coch Mawr, Porth y Ffynnon, Porth Clais - all near St Davids.
Porthlysgi Bay
Porth Henllys
Porthtaflod

North Pembrokeshire
From St Brides Bay to the border with Ceredigion. The north coast forms a part of the southern shore of the larger Cardigan Bay.
Numerous smaller inlets including: Porthstinian, Porth Brag, Porthyn Hyfryd, Porth Cadnaw, Porthselau - all west of St Davids.
Whitesands Bay / Porth Mawr
Numerous smaller inlets including: Porth Lleuog, Porthmelgan, Porth llong, Porth Uwch, Gesail-fawr, Porth Coch, Porth-gwyn, Porth y Dwfr, Porth y Rhaw, Porth Tr-wen, Aberdinas, Aber-pwll - all N of St Davids.
Abereiddi Bay
Numerous smaller inlets including: Porth Egr, Porth Dwfn, Porth Ffynnon, Porth-gain, Gribinau, Pwll Crochan, Aber-draw, Pwll Olfa, Pwll llong, Pwll Whiting, Aber Castle, Aber yw, Pwllstrodur, Aber Mochyn, Porth Glastwr, Aber mawr, Aber Bach, Porth Dwgan, Porth Coch, Pwll March, Pwll Long, Pwllcrochan, Pwlldawnau, Aber Cerrig-gwynion, Pwll Deri, Porth Maenmelyn, Pwll Arian, Pwll ffyliaid
Carreg Onnen Bay
Numerous smaller inlets including: Pwll Bach, Pwlluog, Porthsychan, Aber felin, Pant y Bara, Pany y Dwr, Porth Maen, 
Anglas Bay
Pwll Hir
Fishguard Bay (including Pwll Landdu, Aber Richard, Pwll y Blewyn, Aber Grugog)
Numerous smaller inlets including: Aber Bach, Pwll Gwylog, Pwll cwn, Pwllgwaelod, Aber Careg-y-Fran, Aber Pensidan, Aber Pen-clawdd, Pwll Glas, 
Newport Bay (including Aber Pig-y-baw, Aber Ysgol, Aber Step)
Pwll Coch
Traeth Bach
Ceibwr Bay
Pwllygranant
Pwll y Mwn
Pwll Edrych
Pwll Melyn

Ramsey Island
Ramsey Island is an offshore part of north Pembrokeshire. It includes clockwise from the south the following indentations: Porth Lleuog, Pwll Bendro, Aber Mawr, Bay Ogof Hen, Rhod Uchaf, Rhod Isaf, Aberfelin, Yr Hen-ffordd, Abermyharan

Ceredigion
The Ceredigion coast is a gentle curve forming part of the shore of the larger Cardigan Bay but includes a handful of named indentations.
Cribach Bay
Aberporth Bay
New Quay Bay
Little Quay Bay
Clarach Bay

Powys
The Powys 'coast' is a short stretch of tidal estuary of the River Dovey devoid of bays.

Gwynedd
The coast of Gwynedd includes several bays which are indentations of the larger Cardigan Bay. There are a large number of small bays on the coast of the Llŷn Peninsula.
Barmouth Bay
Porth Fechan
Borth Fawr
Porth Ceiriad
Porth Neigwl / Hell's Mouth
Numerous smaller inlets including: Porth Llawenan, Porth Alwm, Porth Ysgo, Porth Cadlan
Aberdaron Bay (including Porth simdde, Porth Meudwy)
Numerous smaller inlets including: Porth Cloch, Porth y Pistyll, Hen Borth, Parwyd, Porth Felen
Porth Llanllawen
Numerous smaller inlets including: Porthorion, Porth Oer, Porth y Wrach, Porthllwynog, Porth Iago, Dyllborth, Porth Ferin, Porth Widlin, Porth Ty-mawr, Porth Wen Bach, Porth Colmon, Porth Ychain, Porth Gwylan, Porth Ysgaden, Porth Llydan, Porth Ysglaig, Porth Towyn, Aber Geirch, Borth Wen 
Porth Dinllaen
Porth Nefyn
Porth Bodeilias
Porth Pistyll
Porth Howel
Porth y Nant
Caernarfon Bay
Foryd Bay / Y Foryd

Bardsey (Ynys Enlli)
Bardsey is an offshore part of Gwynedd. Numerous small indentations including: Bae'r nant, Bae y Rhigol, Porth Solfach, Porth Hadog, Henllwyn

Anglesey
Anglesey is Wales' largest island. Its coast is heavily indented. Clockwise around its coast from Abermenai Point at its southern tip are:
Llanddwyn Bay
Malltraeth Bay
Numerous smaller inlets including: Porth y Gro, Porth Twyn-mawr, Porth y Cwch, Porth Cae-Ceffylau, Porth Cadwaladr
Aberffraw Bay (including Porth Lleidiog, Porth Terfyn)
Numerous smaller inlets including: Porth Aels, Porth Wen, Porth Cwyfan, Porth China, Pwll Burn, Caethle, Porth Terfyn, Porth Trecastell, Porth Nobla, Porth Sur, Porth y Tywod, 
Cymyran Bay (including Silver Bay, Porth yr Ych (both Holy Island))
Numerous smaller inlets including: Porth Gorslwyn, Porth Cae-du, Borthwen, Porth y Corwgl, Porth yr Hwngan, Porth Gwlach, Porth Saint, Porth y Garan, Porth Castell, Porth Diana, 
Treaddur Bay
Numerous smaller inlets including: Porth yr Afon, Porth y Pwll, Porth-y-post, Porth y Corwgl, Porth Dafarch, Porth Ruffydd, Porth y Gwin, 
Abraham's Bosom (including Porth y Gwyddel)
Gogarth Bay
Porth Namarch
Beddmanarch Bay
Porth Penrhyn-mawr
Numerous smaller inlets including: Porth Dryw, Porth Delysg, Porth Tywyn-mawr, Porth Defaid, Porth Trefadog, Porth y Ffynnon, Porth Fudr, Porth Trwyn, Porth Crugmor or Cable Bay, Porth Tyddyn-uchaf, Porth y Santes, Porth Swtan or Church Bay, Porth y Dwfr, Porth y Bribys, Porth y Nant, Porth yr Hwch, Porth yr Hwch-fach, Port(h) Ffau'r-llwynog, Porth y Dyfn, Porth yr Eboil, Porth Newydd, Porth tywodog, Hen Borth
Cemlyn Bay
Numerous smaller inlets including: Porth-y-pistyll, Porth y Gwartheg, Porth y Galen-ddu, Porth Wnal, 
Cemaes Bay (including Porth yr Ogof, Porth Wyllfa, Porth Padrig)
Porth Llanlleiana
Hell's Mouth / Porth Cynfor
Porth Adfan
Porth Wen
Bull Bay / Porth Llechog (including Pwll y Tarw, Pwll y Merched)
Numerous smaller inlets including: Porth Offeiriad, Aber Cawell, Porth Newydd, Porthyrychen, Porth Eilian, Porth y Corwgl
Fresh Water Bay
Numerous smaller inlets including: Porthygwichiaid, Porth Helygen, Porth yr Aber, Porth Garreg-fawr
Dulas Bay
Porth y Mor
Lligwy Bay
Numerous smaller inlets including: Porth Forllwyd, Porth Helaeth, Porth yr Ynys, Porth Lydan, Porth Nigwyl, Porth Moelfre
Porth y Rhos
Borth-wen
Red Wharf Bay / Traeth-coch (including Porth-llongdy-uchaf)
Porth Penmon

Conwy
The coast of Conwy extends some way to east and west of the Conwy estuary.
Conwy Bay
Ormes Bay / Llandudno Bay
Porth Dyniewaid
Penrhyn Bay
Rhos Bay / Colwyn Bay
(Kinmel Bay)
Liverpool Bay (part)

Denbighshire and Flintshire
There are no bays indenting the coast of either Denbighshire or Flintshire in northeast Wales though both front onto the much larger Liverpool Bay.

References

Geography

 Wales
Lists of landforms of Wales